Law enforcement in Los Angeles County is conducted by a variety of law enforcement agencies.

State agencies
California Highway Patrol
University of California Police Department
California State University Police Department
California Exposition Park Public Safety
California State Hospital Police
California State Park Peace Officer (Ranger)

County agencies
Los Angeles County Sheriff's Department (10,695 sworn Deputy Sheriffs)
Los Angeles County Probation Department

City agencies

Alhambra
Alhambra Police Department

Arcadia
Arcadia Police Department

Azusa
Azusa Police Department

Baldwin Park
Baldwin Park Police Department

Beverly Hills
Beverly Hills Police Department

Bell
Bell Police Department

Bell Gardens
Bell Gardens Police Department

Burbank
Burbank Police Department

Claremont
Claremont Police Department

Covina
Covina Police Department

Culver City
Culver City Police Department

Downey
Downey Police Department

El Monte
El Monte Police Department

El Segundo
El Segundo Police Department

Gardena
Gardena Police Department

Glendale
Glendale Police Department

Glendora
Glendora Police Department

Hawthorne
Hawthorne Police Department

Hermosa Beach
Hermosa Beach Police Department

Huntington Park
Huntington Park Police Department

Inglewood
Inglewood Police Department

La Verne
La Verne Police Department

Los Angeles
Los Angeles Police Department 
Los Angeles Park Ranger Division 
Los Angeles Airport Police Department 
Los Angeles Port Police Department 
Los Angeles School Police Department

Long Beach
Long Beach Police Department
Long Beach Harbor Patrol

Manhattan Beach
Manhattan Beach Police Department

Monrovia
Monrovia Police Department

Montebello
Montebello Police Department

Monterey Park
Monterey Park Police Department

Palos Verdes Estates
Palos Verdes Estates Police Department

Pasadena
Pasadena Police Department

Pomona
Pomona Police Department

Redondo Beach
Redondo Beach Police Department

San Fernando
San Fernando Police Department

San Gabriel
San Gabriel Police Department

San Marino
San Marino Police Department

Santa Fe Springs
Santa Fe Springs Police Department

Santa Monica
   
Santa Monica Police Department

Sierra Madre
Sierra Madre Police Department

Signal Hill
Signal Hill Police Department

South Gate
South Gate Police Department

South Pasadena
South Pasadena Police Department

Torrance
Torrance Police Department

Vernon
Vernon Police Department

West Covina
West Covina Police Department

Whittier
Whittier Police Department

Special District agencies
 Los Angeles Society for the Prevention of Cruelty to Animals Law Enforcement Division

See also
List of law enforcement agencies in California

Law enforcement in California
Government of Los Angeles County, California